Teatro Farnese is a Renaissance theatre in the Palazzo della Pilotta, Parma, Italy. It was built in 1618 by Giovanni Battista Aleotti. The idea of creating this grand theater came from the Duke of Parma and Piacenza Ranuccio I Farnese. The theatre was almost destroyed by an Allied air raid during World War II (1944). It was rebuilt and reopened in 1962.

It is, along with the Teatro all'antica in Sabbioneta and the Teatro Olimpico in Vicenza, one of only three Renaissance theaters still in existence.

Some claim this as the first permanent proscenium theatre (that is, a theatre in which the audience views the action through a single frame, which is known as the "proscenium arch").

References
Notes

Cited sources
King, Kimball, Western Drama Through the Ages, Greenwood Publishing Group, 2007.  
Kuritz, Paul, The making of theatre history, Paul Kuritz, 1988. , 

Other sources
  Paolo Donati, Descrizione del gran teatro farnesiano di Parma e notizie storiche sul medesimo. Blanchon, Parma, 1817.
  Pietro de Lama, Descrizione del Teatro Farnese di Parma. Published by A. Nobili, Bologna, 1818.
  Bruno Adorni, L'architettura farnesiana a Parma 1545–1630. Battei, Parma, 1974, pp. 70–78.
  Vittorio Gandolfi, Il Teatro Farnese di Parma. Battei, Parma, 1980;.
  Adriano Cavicchi e Marzio Dall'Acqua, Il Teatro Farnese di Parma. Parma, 1986.
  Gianni Capelli, Il Teatro Farnese di Parma. Architettura, scene, spettacoli. Public Promo Service, Parma, 1990.
  Luca Ronconi and others, Lo spettacolo e la meraviglia. Il Teatro Farnese di Parma e la festa barocca. Nuova ERI, Torino, 1992.
  Jadranka Bentini, Il Teatro Farnese: caratteristiche e trasformazioni, in Il Palazzo della Pilotta a Parma. Dai servizi della corte alle moderne istituzioni culturali. FMR, 1996. pp. 113–123. 
  Milena Fornari, Il Teatro Farnese: decorazione e spazio barocco in La pittura in Emilia e in Romagna. Il Seicento, II. Milano, 1993, pp. 92–101.

Theatres in Emilia-Romagna
Teatro Farnese
Performing arts venues in Emilia-Romagna
Theatres completed in 1618
1618 establishments in Italy